Ben Kanute (born December 14, 1992) is an American triathlete who competed at the 2016 Summer Olympics. In 2017 and 2022 he took second place at the Ironman 70.3 World Championship.

Career
Kanute is the 2015 USA Triathlon Elite National champion. He teamed with Gwen Jorgensen, Kirsten Casper, and Joe Maloy to win the 2016 ITU Triathlon Mixed Relay World Championships for the United States. Kanute qualified for the 2016 Summer Olympics through his placement in a May 2016 qualifying race. He finished 29th at the Olympics in a combined time of 1:48:59.

Personal life
Kanute studied at Marmion Academy, and graduated in physiology from the University of Arizona after just three years. He took up triathlons at the age of eight inspired by his father. He has two younger brothers, Josh and Nick.

References

External links

 Official website

1992 births
Living people
American male triathletes
Olympic triathletes of the United States
Triathletes at the 2016 Summer Olympics
People from Geneva, Illinois